The Holy Trinity Church, Eastbourne, is an Anglican Early English-style place of worship in Eastbourne in the English county of East Sussex.

It was designed by Decimus Burton and opened in 1839 as a Chapel of ease for St Mary the Virgin. Aisles and the east end of the chancel were added in 1855 and 1861 respectively. It became a parish church in 1847.

References

Churches completed in 1839
1839 establishments in England
Church of England church buildings in East Sussex
Churches in Eastbourne